The Valencia Metro (Spanish: Metro Valencia or Metro de Valencia) is the public mass transit system of Valencia, Carabobo, Venezuela and its suburbs Naguanagua Municipality and San Diego Municipality.

The metro system was officially opened to the public on 18 November 2006 with just 3 of 7 stations along the original  Line 1 route open for service, and operating for limited hours while providing service free of charge.   Normal revenue service with all 7 stations along Line 1 began 18 November 2007.  

Although the fleet comprises twelve Siemens SD-460 2-car light rail vehicle trainsets, the Valencia system is a light metro, running on a completely grade-separated route (other than within its own maintenance yard) that does not share space with any other traffic.

Valencia Metro operates Monday-Friday from 6am to 8:30pm; Saturday, Sunday and holidays from 6:00am to 7:30pm. An adult fare of 0.5 BsF (23 US cents) and a student fare of 0.15 BsF (7 US Cents) is charged to ride the metro. An average of 62,000 passenger are transported daily.

Lines

Currently the Valencia Metro operates Line 1 for service, with a further  section (Line 2) of the same north-south route under construction, and a third  section (Line 3) in the engineering and environmental impact phases. Not every segment of construction on this route is an independent "line." When the system is fully completed, it will form a single continuous route, with no transfers necessary to complete a trip along the route. 

See also

 Caracas Metro
 Los Teques Metro
 Maracaibo Metro
 IAFE Venezuelan National Railway
 List of Latin American rail transit systems by ridership
 Medium-capacity rail transport system (light metro)
 List of tram and light rail transit systems
 List of metro systems

References

External links

Metro Valencia C.A. - official website 
 UrbanRail.net: Valencia

Rapid transit in Venezuela
Underground rapid transit in Venezuela
Railway lines opened in 2006
2006 establishments in Venezuela